The Tri-Nation Series in Scotland in 2011 was the One Day International cricket tournament in Scotland that was a tri-nation series between Ireland, Scotland and Sri Lanka.

Squads

Group stage table

Group matches

References 

One Day International cricket competitions
International cricket tours of Scotland
2012 in Scottish cricket